Curtis Hamilton may refer to:

 Curtis Hamilton (actor) (born 1985), American actor
 Curtis Hamilton (ice hockey) (born 1991), American-born Canadian ice hockey player